This is a list of flag bearers who have represented Guyana at the Olympics.

Flag bearers carry the national flag of their country at the opening ceremony of the Olympic Games.

See also
Guyana at the Olympics

References

Guyana at the Olympics
Guyana
Olympic flag bearers